Flying Hoofs is a 1925 American silent Western film, directed by Clifford S. Smith. It stars Jack Hoxie, Bartlett Carré, and William Welsh, and was released on February 8, 1925.

Cast list

Preservation
A complete print of Flying Hoofs is reportedly held by a private collector.

References

External links

 
 
 

Universal Pictures films
1925 Western (genre) films
1925 films
American black-and-white films
Silent American Western (genre) films
1920s American films